Pierre-François Sodini (born 22 June 1989) is a French former professional footballer who played as a defender. He agreed the termination of his contract with SC Bastia on 31 July 2012.

References

1989 births
Living people
French footballers
SC Bastia players
Footballers from Corsica
Association football defenders
Corsica international footballers
Ligue 2 players